Traci Lords (born Nora Louise Kuzma; May 7, 1968) is an American actress and singer. She entered the adult film industry using a fake birth certificate to conceal that she was two years under the legal age of eighteen. Lords starred in adult films and was one of the most sought-after actresses in that industry during her career. When the FBI acted on an anonymous tip that Lords was a minor during her time in the industry, and that pornographers were distributing and selling these illegal images and videotapes, the resulting fallout led to prosecution of those responsible for creating and distributing the tapes. In addition, all but the last of her adult films were banned as child pornography.

After leaving the pornography industry two days after turning the legal age of eighteen, Lords enrolled at the Lee Strasberg Theater Institute, where she studied method acting with the intention of becoming a mainstream actress. She made her mainstream screen debut at age nineteen in a leading role in the 1988 remake of the 1957 Roger Corman science fiction film Not of This Earth. Lords followed with the role of Wanda Woodward in John Waters' teen comedy, Cry-Baby (1990). Her other acting credits included the television series MacGyver, Married... with Children, Tales from the Crypt, Roseanne, Melrose Place, Profiler, First Wave, Highlander: The Series, Gilmore Girls and Will & Grace. She also appeared in films such as Skinner (1993), Virtuosity (1995), Blade (1998), Zack and Miri Make a Porno (2008) and Excision (2012), which earned her a Fangoria Chainsaw Award for Best Supporting Actress as well as a Fright Meter Award and a CinEuphoria Award.

Lords also pursued music in addition to her film career. After her song "Love Never Dies" was featured on the soundtrack to the film Pet Sematary Two (1992), she was signed to Radioactive Records and subsequently released her debut studio album, 1000 Fires (1995) to generally positive reviews. Despite the poor sales of the album, the lead single "Control" had moderate commercial success. It peaked at number two on the Billboard Hot Dance Club Songs chart and was included on the soundtrack to the film Mortal Kombat (1995), which was eventually certified double platinum by the Recording Industry Association of America (RIAA). In 2003, Lords published her autobiography, Traci Lords: Underneath It All, which received positive reviews from critics and debuted at number 31 on The New York Times Best Seller list.

Life and career

1968–1983: Early life 

Lords was born Nora Louise Kuzma on May 7, 1968, in Steubenville, Ohio,  to Louis and Patricia Kuzma. Her father's parents were of Ukrainian descent, while her mother was of Irish ancestry. Louis was employed as a steelworker. Kuzma has one elder sister, Lorraine, and two younger sisters, Rachel and Grace. Her parents divorced when she was seven years old and Kuzma moved with her mother and three sisters to her great-grandmother's house. Following the divorce, her alcoholic, abusive father got partial custody. Around that same time, her mother enrolled at Ohio University and became employed part-time.

When Kuzma was 12, she moved with her mother, her mother's new boyfriend, and sisters to Redondo Beach, California. She did not see her father for many years after. In September 1982, she began attending Redondo Union High School but dropped out at age 15 to enter the porn industry. During her early school years, Kuzma developed a rebellious attitude. She was angry at her mother and found a father figure in her mother's boyfriend Roger Hayes, as she calls him in her autobiography; he was a drug abuser and molested Kuzma in her sleep. After her mother broke up with Hayes due to his drug use, she began dating his friend. Kuzma refused to follow them to a new place and was left with her older sister Lorraine. Her mother and two younger sisters eventually found a new apartment.

1984–1986: Pornography career 
At age 15, Kuzma became pregnant by her high school boyfriend. Afraid of her mother's reaction, she went to Hayes for help. He arranged for her to have an abortion without her mother's knowledge. Looking for a job to get some money, she was introduced to Hayes' friend and started working for her as a babysitter. The woman offered to improve Kuzma's job opportunities by helping her get a fake driver's license. She provided Kuzma with a new birth certificate on condition that if she were ever caught she would say that she had stolen the phony identification. Kuzma now had the alias Kristie Elizabeth Nussman and a new driver's license that stated she was 20 rather than 15 years old. In February 1984, she answered a newspaper advertisement for Jim South's World Modeling Talent Agency. Posing as her stepfather, Hayes drove her to the agency. After signing a contract, she began working as a nude model and appeared in magazines such as Velvet, Juggs, and Club. During August, when she was selected to model for Penthouse magazine's September 1984 15th-anniversary issue, Kuzma was asked to choose a stage name. According to a 1988 interview, she chose Traci—one of the popular names she had longed for growing up—and Lords, after the actor Jack Lord, since she was a fan of the television series Hawaii Five-O, in which he played Steve McGarrett.

Lords made the first of many porn movies in 1984, when she appeared in What Gets Me Hot! alongside Tom Byron, who later became her boyfriend offscreen. She first appeared only in a non-sexual role but was later replaced with a hardcore scene. In her next movie, Those Young Girls, she appeared in a sex role alongside Harry Reems and Ginger Lynn. After turning 16 and appearing with John Leslie (an actor 23 years her senior) in the porno parody Talk Dirty to Me Part III (which won the AVN Award for the best movie), Lords was hailed as the "Princess of Porn". She became one of the highest-paid porn actresses of that time, earning more than $1,000 a day. Besides her work in porn, she also appeared in the music video for "Gimme Gimme Good Lovin'" by the heavy metal band Helix. Lords continued making more movies until late 1984 when she tried to quit the industry at age 16, but returned a few months later. Just before her 17th birthday, she met Stuart Dell, who became her boyfriend, manager, and business partner - Dell used the pseudonym Steven (or Stephen) Cartier. Together they formed the Traci Lords Company. Dell and Lords made a distribution deal with Sy Adler, an industry veteran who ran Vantage International, in which they would produce three movies for the company. In March 1986, the first TLC feature was released; titled Traci Takes Tokyo, it was shot in Tokyo around Christmas Day 1985. The second, Beverly Hills Copulator, was released afterwards, but the third movie, Screamer, was shelved.

During late May 1986 (around three weeks after Lords' 18th birthday), authorities were informed that she had been underage when she appeared in the porn movies. She had lied (according to Lords, it was a "white lie") to law enforcement, photographers, producers, directors, co-workers, and the general public for two years. The owners of her movie agency and X-Citement Video, Inc. were arrested (see United States v. X-Citement Video, Inc.). She was taken into protective custody and hired high-profile lawyer Leslie Abramson. On July 10, district attorney's investigators searched Lords' Redondo Beach home as well as the Sun Valley offices of Vantage International Productions (a major producer of adult movies) and the Sherman Oaks offices of modeling agent Jim South. South and other industry officials said that Lords, who was seeking employment, provided a California driver's license, a U.S. passport, and a birth certificate, which stated that her name was Kristie Nussman and gave a birth date of November 17, 1962. Leslie Jay, a spokeswoman for Penthouse publisher Bob Guccione, also said Lords showed identification indicating that she was older than 18 before the illicit photos for the September 1984 issue were taken. When investigators used Lords' fake birth certificate and fake state identification cards to locate the real Kristie Nussman, Nussman said that her birth certificate had been stolen a few years earlier and that an impostor had apparently forged her name on official forms. Two adults who knew Lords, but who requested anonymity, said they saw her picture in the adult magazine Velvet during July 1984 and telephoned the district attorney's office to inform authorities that she was underage, but that an investigator told them, "There isn't anything we can do about it."

On July 17, 1986, video rental shops and adult movie theaters in the US scrambled to remove from their inventory all hardcore material featuring Lords in order to avoid prosecution for distributing child pornography. John Weston, attorney of the Adult Film Association of America, said distributors should withdraw any movie made before May 1986, featuring Lords "in sexual conduct, no matter how briefly." The withdrawal of Lords' movies from the market cost the industry millions of dollars. Government prosecutors declared that Lords was a victim of a manipulative industry, maintaining that she was drugged and made to do non-consensual acts. Industry insiders, including Ron Jeremy, Tom Byron, Peter North, and Ginger Lynn said they never saw her use drugs and that she was always fully aware of her actions. While most of Lords' movies were permanently removed from distribution in the United States, several were re-edited to remove her scenes (such as Kinky Business and New Wave Hookers), or in a few cases, had new footage filmed with a different actress playing her part (as in Talk Dirty to Me Part III). Her only porn movie legally available in the United States is Traci, I Love You, filmed in Cannes, France two days after her 18th birthday.

1987–1991: Transition to mainstream, Not of This Earth and Cry-Baby 
After spending several months in therapy, Lords decided to concentrate on acting. She enrolled at the Lee Strasberg Theatre and Film Institute, where she studied method acting for three months. After leaving the school, Lords placed an advertisement in The Hollywood Reporter looking for representation. She was contacted by Fred Westheimer and although the agency declined to officially represent her, he decided to send her out on a few auditions. As a result, she was offered a guest role in an episode of the television series Wiseguy. Shortly afterwards, she met the director Jim Wynorski, who was directing the remake of Roger Corman's 1957 sci-fi classic Not of This Earth. He immediately cast Lords into the lead role of Nadine Story, and Not of This Earth (1988) became her first mainstream film debut since her departure from the adult film industry. Although the film failed at the box office, it did well in video sales. Based on that success, Lords was offered to appear in Wynorski's next film, The Haunting of Morella (1989). However, Lords turned down the offer due to the requirement of having a nude scene, since she was trying to establish herself as a serious actress. She also signed with a modeling agency under her birth name Nora Kuzma and appeared on two covers of Joe Weider's magazine Muscle & Fitness. Around that time, Lords became a spokesperson for Children of the Night, an organization for runaways and abused children, and was planning to release a book titled Out of the Blue: The Traci Lords Story.

In November 1988, Lords enrolled in another acting class and again began looking for an agent. In December, she mass-mailed her resumé to various agents and arranged a meeting with Don Gerler. Lords auditioned for the part of Breathless Mahoney in the film Dick Tracy (1990), but the role went to Madonna. In March 1989, John Waters auditioned her for his teenage comedy musical Cry-Baby (1990); Waters had referred to Lords as a "sexual terrorist". She won the role and appeared in the film alongside Johnny Depp and Ricki Lake. The film was a critical and commercial success, and her portrayal of the rebellious teenager Wanda Woodward established her as a legitimate actress. On the set of the film, she met the property master Brook Yeaton, whom she began dating. The couple married in September 1990 in Baltimore, Maryland. In June 1990, the exercise video Warm up with Traci Lords was released. Directed and produced by her former boyfriend and business partner Stewart Dell, the video had been filmed in early 1988. As Lords wrote in her autobiography, she was unsatisfied with the final version of the video. An extended version was reissued in 1993 under the title Traci Lords: Advanced Jazzthetics.

In 1991, Lords starred in the thriller Raw Nerve and the action crime film A Time to Die. Lords appeared in such popular TV shows as Roseanne, Married... with Children, MacGyver and Hercules. She continued modeling and walked the runway for fashion designers such as Janet Howard and Thierry Mugler.

1992–1996: Breakthrough, 1000 Fires and Melrose Place 
During 1992, Lords decided to emphasize her career as a recording artist. She first signed a development deal with Capitol Records. After meeting with Rodney Bingenheimer at a birthday party, she was recommended to Jeff Jacklin, who hired her to record the song "Love Never Dies" for the movie Pet Sematary Two (1992). The producer of the soundtrack, Gary Kurfirst, signed Lords to his company Radioactive Records. She was later featured on the songs "Little Baby Nothing" by Manic Street Preachers and "Somebody to Love" by Ramones. During 1993, Lords was cast in the television adaptation of Stephen King's novel The Tommyknockers.

During the spring of 1994, Lords began working on her debut album. The company arranged her to fly to London and meet with producer Tom Bailey. After finishing her recording with Bailey, Lords was introduced to producer Ben Watkins of Juno Reactor with whom she recorded more techno-influenced songs. She later met Mike Edwards, the main singer of the band Jesus Jones. Around the same time, Lords was cast in the television series Roseanne, appearing in three episodes. During January 1995, Lords appeared in four episodes of the television series Melrose Place, where she played the part of Rikki Abbott. Her debut studio album, 1000 Fires, was released on February 28, 1995. It received generally positive reviews and the lead single "Control" peaked at number two on the Billboard Hot Dance Club Songs. An instrumental version of "Control" was remixed and released on the soundtrack to Mortal Kombat (1995), which was certified double platinum by the Recording Industry Association of America (RIAA). The album's second single, "Fallen Angel", was also successful in charts, peaking at number eleven on Hot Dance Club Songs. The Paul Oakenfold remix of the song was included on the soundtrack of the movie Virtuosity (1995), in which Lords had a cameo appearance. After the release of the album, Lords embarked on a small tour performing as a DJ, mostly in Miami nightclubs. On August 12, 1995, she was the opening act of the Lollapalooza after-party, Enit Festival, alongside Moby, Sven Väth, DJ Keoki and Single Cell Orchestra.

By the end of 1995, Lords divorced her husband of five years, Brook Yeaton. In 1996, she appeared in a commercial for GUESS with Juliette Lewis.

1997–2002: Profiler, Blade and First Wave 
In 1997, Lords appeared in a small part in the Gregg Araki film Nowhere, and starred in the drama thriller Stir. She also guest starred on television series Nash Bridges and Viper. In November, she became a recurring cast member in the second season of the crime television series Profiler. She played a felon, Sharon Lesher, who is manipulated by a serial killer Jack-of-All-Trades and eventually becomes his partner in crime Jill-of-All-Trades. In 1998, Lords had a supporting role in the crime thriller Boogie Boy and starred in the drama Extramarital. She also appeared in the action horror film Blade (1998) in which she played the vampire seductress Racquel. Lords was eventually approached to appear in the sequel Blade II (2002) portraying Racquel's twin sister Valerine in seeking of vengeance upon Blade. However, she turned down the offer because of her contradictory schedule. At the premiere of the film, Lords announced she was finishing her sophomore album on Radioactive Records that would be released in the spring of 1999. However, it was later neglected after she left the record label. In August, Lords ended her two-year relationship with John Enos after they reportedly got into an argument because her cat was killed by one of Enos' dogs.

In 2000, Lords had lead roles in the films Epicenter and Chump Change. Her role of Sam in the romantic comedy Chump Change earned her the Film Discovery Jury Award for Best Actress at the U.S. Comedy Arts Festival. In September, she became a regular cast member in the third season of the Sci-fi Channel television series First Wave, becoming the first recurring female character to be featured on the series. She played Jordan Radcliffe, an heiress and leader of the Human Resistance Group "The Raven Nation" after the aliens used her brother to murder her parents.

2003–2006: Underneath It All 

Her autobiography, Traci Lords: Underneath It All, was published during July 2003 by HarperCollins. In the book, Lords chronicled her childhood, career, and two-year stint in the x-rated industry. The book received positive reviews from critics and was a commercial success, making The New York Times Best Seller list. It was criticized by pornographers, who claim they were the victims. In the book, Lords revealed that she received about  $35,000 as total compensation for all her porno movies, including the $5,000 for her underage appearance in Penthouse. Lords continued to use the now-famous stage name that she had given herself as a minor and ultimately made it her legal name. She explained, "I chose to stop running from it. Instead, I own it, legally changing my name to Traci Elizabeth Lords. That's who I was, and that's who I was going to be." In her interview with Oprah Winfrey she stated: "I found you can run, but you cannot hide."

During 2003, it was announced that Lords was working on new music and had recorded a cover version of Missing Persons' song "Walking In L.A.". Directed by Mike Ruiz, the music video was premiered during her interview on The Oprah Winfrey Show. On December 28, 2004, she independently released two songs, "Sunshine" and "You Burn Inside of Me", via online music store CD Baby. Both of the songs along with "What Cha Gonna Do" was featured in the television series Joan of Arcadia. "You Burn Inside of Me" was also used in the commercial for Duprey Cosmetics, in which Lords appeared. She signed to Sea To Sun records the following year, and released the chart-topping single "Last Drag".  Lords is currently recording new music in Los Angeles.

2007–2009: Motherhood and Zack and Miri Make a Porno 
By the beginning of 2007, Lords became unexpectedly pregnant. She first announced her pregnancy in June: "I kind of thought the children thing was off the table. Now I'm expecting a boy! We're stunned and thrilled. I just want you to know, these 36-Ds are mine. I haven't had a boob job, she laughed! I am 5 months pregnant! But now I'm starting to show. And my husband is happy with the changes in my figure." On October 7, 2007, at the age of 39, she gave birth to a son, Gunnar Lords Lee, her first child with her husband of five years, Jeff Lee.

In January 2008, it was announced that Lords had been cast in Kevin Smith's comedy Zack and Miri Make a Porno (2008). She said that at first she wanted to refuse but changed her mind after reading the script. "It was really great that in taking the movie because I didn't plan on going back to work right away, but I was dying to work with Kevin. I never thought it would be on something called Zack and Miri Make a Porno. What? So I went and I read the script at his house and I was prepared to say no. I thought I have the perfect out. I just had a kid. No one is going to blame me if I say I just can't do this right now. But it made me laugh out loud and it made me just literally cry. It was just funny." Initially, the character had a topless scene in the movie, but Lords refused. "I'm done with all that," she said. Lords chose to breastfeed her son in between takes instead. Katie Morgan, a pornographic actress, also appeared in the film.

In 2009, Lords appeared in the direct-to-DVD science fiction movie, Princess of Mars, alongside Antonio Sabàto Jr. She was disappointed by the final project. "Somewhere in my heart of hearts, I was worried that it might be a crummy movie. The production was just too careless. But I believed the voices of those around me who said 'No, it'll be artistic, no, it'll be creative. You'll look beautiful. We have a very limited budget but honest, you'll be proud.'  They were wrong, it was very bad. At least that was what I was told. After watching the first two minutes I had to turn it off and hide under the covers."

2010–2014: Return to music and Excision 
In March 2010, Lords announced she began working on her new album with "Pretty" being the lead single. However, the project was later shelved and "Pretty" was released as a promotional single only. Lords starred in the drama comedy Au Pair, Kansas which premiered in April 2011 at the Kansas City FilmFest. In July, Lords officially signed to independent record label Sea To Sun Recordings and in October made her musical comeback with the song "Last Drag". The single was successful in dance charts debuting at number forty-five and eventually peaking at number four on the Billboard Dance Club Songs.

Lords starred alongside AnnaLynne McCord and Ariel Winter in the horror film Excision (2012), which premiered in January 2012 at the Sundance Film Festival. Her portrayal of the controlling mother Phyllis earned Lords Fangoria Chainsaw Award for Best Supporting Actress as well as Fright Meter Award and CinEuphoria Award. In September, Lords released a compilation of dance music Traci Lords Presents: M2F2 (2012). It featured three of her own remixed tracks as well as songs by other artists. The song "He's My Bitch" managed to chart on the Billboard Dance Club Songs peaking at number twenty-five. Lords also voiced the character of Layla Stockton in the 2012 video game Hitman: Absolution. Following the Steubenville High School rape case, Lords spoke up on the topic and subsequently released the song "Stupidville" as a response to the case. "I was born in Steubenville, Ohio and I was raped in there. So was my mother. I think there's a sickness in that city," Lords said. In 2013, Lords appeared in the horror movie Devil May Call (2013) and an episode of the web series EastSiders. She was nominated for the Best Guest Star – Drama at the 2014 Indie Series Awards.

2015–present: Fashion career and upcoming directorial debut 
In May 2015, Lords appeared in an episode of the fourth season of the reality television series Celebrity Wife Swap, where she swapped lives with Jackée Harry. Lords co-starred in Jim Wynorski's television horror Sharkansas Women's Prison Massacre (2015) and made her second appearance as Val on the series EastSiders. In March 2016, Lords co-starred in the television thriller Nightmare Nurse (2016) in which she played a psychopathic nurse looking for revenge for her dead husband. Lords voiced several characters in the action-adventure video game Hitman (2016) after having had previously voiced the character of Layla Stockton in Hitman: Absolution (2012). 

In June, Lords announced her collaboration with Pinup Girl Clothing. The first pieces from her collection were inspired by the character of Wanda Woodward from Cry-Baby (1990) as well as 1950s fashion; the clothing line is available exclusively through the Pinup Girl Clothing website. She commented on her inspiration behind the line: "John [Waters] wrote such strong characters in Cry-Baby. And in that rockabilly, punk rock, vintage pin-up girl kind of world, Wanda Woodward is pretty much a queen."

In 2016, Lords co-starred in the Viaplay original comedy series Swedish Dicks. She played Jane McKinney, a private investigator and competitor of the show's protagonist. In October, the series was renewed for a second season with Lords as a confirmed cast member. In the United States, the first season premiered in August 2017. Later that month, Lords confirmed she would direct her first feature film called The Unquiet Grave. Filming was scheduled to commence in 2017. In November, it was announced that Lords voiced the character of Jackal Z in the upcoming video game Let It Die (2016), and will appear on the third season of EastSiders. In July 2017, Helmut Lang's fashion campaign for the Fall 2017 collection featuring Lords was unveiled. In May 2018, Lords released the single "Come Alive" as a gift for her fans in celebration of her 50th birthday. Following the release it was announced that she began working on an EP with Adam Barta and Jordan Von Haslow. In July 2018, the second season of Swedish Dicks premiered in the United States.

As of 2020, Lords continues to act, and has had a number of films released over the last couple of years. Due to the COVID-19 pandemic, the release date for her 2020 film Nicole, her Ex & the Killer is still in limbo.

Activism

Lords has publicly stated her support of the LGBT community.
She has also done work to encourage runaways and homeless teens to get off the streets, such as her promos for Children of the Night.

Filmography

Discography

 1000 Fires (1995)

Bibliography
 Traci Lords: Underneath It All (2003)

See also
 Golden Age of Porn

References

Footnotes

Sources

 
 
 
 Nicolas Barbano: Verdens 25 hotteste pornostjerner (Rosinante, Denmark 1999) 
 Steve Rag (= Tim Greaves): Norma K. nr. 1-2 and Nora K. nr. 3-6 (England 1990–1992): Traci Lords-fanzine
 Steve Rag (= Tim Greaves): The Nora K. Kompendium (Media Publications, England 1996): The best from Norma K./Nora K.
 Brad Linaweaver (pub): Traci Lords – Incomparable (Mondo Cult, 2009)
 Suzanne Somers (ed): Wednesday's Children: Adult Survivors of Abuse Speak Out (Putnam Adult, 1992)
 Frank C. Naylor El cine X underground. Llevándolo al límite, 2009 Ed.: Lulu

External links

 
 
 
 
 
 

 
1968 births
20th-century American actresses
20th-century American singers
21st-century American actresses
21st-century American singers
21st-century American writers
21st-century American women writers
Actors from Redondo Beach, California
Actresses from Ohio
Age controversies
American child actresses
American female adult models
American pornographic film actresses
American film actresses
American film producers
American people of Irish descent
American people of Ukrainian descent
American television actresses
American video game actresses
American voice actresses
Child pornography
Lee Strasberg Theatre and Film Institute alumni
American LGBT rights activists
Living people
Penthouse Pets
People from Steubenville, Ohio
Pornographic film actors from Ohio
Writers from Ohio
American women film producers
20th-century American women singers
21st-century American women singers
Spike Video Game Award winners